Old Colony Railroad Station may refer to:

 Old Colony Railroad Station (North Easton, Massachusetts)
 Old Colony Railroad Station (Taunton, Massachusetts)
 Stoughton Railroad Station